Extremadura Unión Deportiva "B" is the reserve team of Extremadura UD, a Spanish football club based in Almendralejo, in the autonomous community of Extremadura. Founded in 1986 as Atlético San José Promesas it last played in Tercera División RFEF - Group 14, holding home games at Estadio Tomás de la Hera, with a 3,000-seat capacity.

History
Founded in 1986, San José Promesas only started to have a senior team in 2004. On 21 June 2016, the club was integrated into the structure of Extremadura UD and became its reserve team. With the aim to respect its history, the club would be named also as Extremadura-San José and will continue wearing its classic mauve kit. In the following season, the reserve team was renamed to Extremadura B.

In March 2022, Extremadura B was expelled from the Tercera División RFEF after two consecutive no-shows.

Season to season
As Club Atlético San José Promesas

As Extremadura UD's reserve team

 11 seasons in Tercera División
 1 season in Tercera División RFEF

References

External links
Official blog 
Futbolme team profile 

Football clubs in Extremadura
Association football clubs established in 1986
1986 establishments in Spain
Spanish reserve football teams